Mu Pegasi or μ Pegasi, formally named Sadalbari, is a star in the northern constellation of Pegasus. The apparent visual magnitude of this star is 3.5, which is bright enough to be seen with the naked eye even on a moonlit night.

Nomenclature
μ Pegasi (Latinised to Mu Pegasi) is the star's Bayer designation.

It bore the traditional name Sadalbari, which derives from  saʿd al-bāriʿ, the “auspicious star of the splendid one.” In 2016, the International Astronomical Union organized a Working Group on Star Names (WGSN) to catalogue and standardize proper names for stars. The WGSN approved the name Sadalbari for this star on 21 August 2016 and it is now so included in the List of IAU-approved Star Names.

Properties
The spectrum of this star matches a stellar classification of G8 III. The luminosity class of 'III' means that it has exhausted the hydrogen fuel at its core and evolved into a giant star. It is slightly more massive than the Sun, but has expanded to nearly ten times the Sun's radius. (Mishenina et al. (2006) list it with an estimated 2.7 times the mass of the Sun.) The effective temperature of the outer atmosphere is about 4,950 K, which is cooler than the Sun and gives it the yellow hue of a G-type star. The abundance of elements other than hydrogen and helium, what astronomers term the metallicity, is similar to the abundance in the Sun.

References

G-type giants
Pegasus (constellation)
Pegasi, Mu
Durchmusterung objects
Pegasi, 48
4298
216131
112748
8684
Sadalbari